Tragedies is the first full-length album by the Norwegian funeral doom/death metal band Funeral. Track one of the album, "Taarene" is sung in Norwegian, while the other four tracks are sung in English. The album contains three original tracks and two from the Beyond All Sunsets demo. It was originally released through Arctic Serenades, then rereleased through Firebox Records, along with the Tristesse demo and three bonus tracks. In 1994, shortly before the release of this album, Funeral recruited a female vocalist named Toril Snyen. Funeral was one of the first doom metal bands to do so. Late in 1995, Funeral would part ways with Snyen. Tragedies was one of the albums that helped form the subgenre of funeral doom.

Track listing

Rereleased track listing

Disc 1 (Tragedies)

Disc 2 (Tristesse)

References

1995 albums
Funeral (band) albums